Guy Avanzini (7 July 1929 – 18 October 2022) was a French academic, historian, and philosopher. A professor of social sciences at Lumière University Lyon 2, he was a specialist in the history of pedagogical ideas and a historian of educational theories.

Publications
Le temps de l'adolescence (1965)
L'Échec scolaire (1967)
La Contribution de Binet à l'élaboration d'une pédagogie scientifique (1969)
Immobilisme et novation dans l'éducation scolaire (1975)
La Pédagogie au 20e siècle (1978)
Histoire de la pédagogie du 17e siècle à nos jours (1981)
L'école d'hier à demain: des illusions d'une politique à la politique des illusions (1991)
Introduction aux sciences de l'éducation (1992)
La pédagogie aujourd'hui (1996)
Alfred Binet (1999)
Penser la philosophie de l'éducation (2012)
La pensée d'Antoine de la Garanderie - Lecture plurielle de Guy Avanzini, Guy Le Bouëdec, Thierry de la Garanderie et Jean-Yves Levesque (2013)
Intuitions pédagogiques de Don Bosco (2016)

References

1929 births
2022 deaths
French historians
French philosophers
People from Grenoble